Francis J. Borchardt (1849–1915) was a member of the Wisconsin State Assembly.

Biography
Borchardt was born September 25, 1849, in Schrimm, Prussian Province of Posen (Śrem, Poland) . He moved to Milwaukee, Wisconsin in 1853. During the American Civil War, he served with the 1st Wisconsin Heavy Artillery Regiment of the Union Army. Afterwards, he became an officer in the Wisconsin Army National Guard.

Political career
Borchardt was a member of the Assembly in 1882. Previously, he was elected a justice of the peace in 1877, 1879 and 1881.

References

1849 births
1915 deaths
People from Śrem
People from the Province of Posen
Prussian emigrants to the United States
Politicians from Milwaukee
Democratic Party members of the Wisconsin State Assembly
American justices of the peace
People of Wisconsin in the American Civil War
Military personnel from Milwaukee
Union Army soldiers
United States Army officers
19th-century American judges